Mix FM was the first Dance radio station in Karabakh and first started broadcasting on 1 October 2007 via 105.0 FM to the audiences of Stepanakert and its peripheral regions.

External links
The European radio map
SRadio Live

Radio stations in Armenia
Mass media in Stepanakert
Radio stations established in 2007
Defunct mass media in Armenia